Herbert Bell (30 November 1818 – 15 February 1876) was born in Scotland and immigrated to Canada in the 1840s, settling at Alberton, Prince Edward Island.

Bell was actively involved in a number of pursuits after arriving in Prince County.  He was a farmer, merchant, and shipbuilder at this location. Later, when firmly established economically, he entered politics. He eventually became president of the Legislative Council's upper house and held that position until his death.

External links 
 Biography at the Dictionary of Canadian Biography Online

People from Alberton, Prince Edward Island
1818 births
1876 deaths
Members of the Legislative Council of Prince Edward Island
Scottish emigrants to pre-Confederation Prince Edward Island
Colony of Prince Edward Island people